Pasi may refer to:

 Pasi (caste), a Hindu caste of northern India
 Pasi (film), a 1979 Tamil film
 Pasi (given name)
 Pasi (surname), a surname of the Pasi community
 Pasi, Papua New Guinea, a settlement near the coast of Sandaun Province, Papua New Guinea
 Pasi language, a Sepik language of Papua New Guinea
 Pasi, a subgroup of the Adi people of the Eastern Himalayas
Pasi, a variety of the Sino-Tibetan Adi language
 PASI, ICAO code for the Sitka Rocky Gutierrez Airport, in Sitka, Alaska

See also 
 Patria Pasi, a Finnish-made armoured personnel carrier (APC)
 Turuk Pasi, a Muslim community of Bihar, India
 Passi (disambiguation)
 Passy (disambiguation)